Drysdalia rhodogaster, also known as the mustard-bellied snake or Blue Mountains crowned snake, is a species of venomous snake endemic to Australia. The specific epithet rhodogaster (“red-bellied”) refers to body colouration.

Description
The snake grows to an average of about 40 cm in length. The upper body is brown to grey, with a darker head and a yellow to orange band over the nape.

Behaviour
The species is viviparous, with an average litter size of five. Its diet consists mainly of lizards.

Distribution and habitat
The species’ distribution is limited to south-eastern New South Wales.

References

 
rhodogaster
Snakes of Australia
Reptiles of New South Wales
Taxa named by Giorgio Jan
Reptiles described in 1873